Era mio Fratello (Translation: He was my Brother) is a two episode television miniseries that aired in 2007 on Rai Uno. The first episode aired on 30 September 2007 in Italy and the second episode aired on 1 October that same year. It is the first Italian television series having 'ndrangheta as main theme.  Filming took place in  Calabria, in the cities of Reggio Calabria, Palmi, Catona, Melito and Pentedattilo. The La Repubblica television critic Antonio Dipollina appreciated the miniseries, commenting that it has "the same rhythm and language of the most modern crime series".

Synopsis
Two brothers are forced into very different lives after they part ways at a very young age. One will grow up to be like their underworld father while the other was raised by a police officer and follows the straight and narrow. Their lives are doomed to eventually intersect, pitting brother against brother.

Cast
Maurizio Aiello as Michele Palmisano
Pasquale Anselmo as Ettore Lanfranchi
Paolo Briguglia as Luca
Maria Pia Calzone as Luisa Libertino
Carlo Cartier as Dario Salerno
Adriano Chiaramida as Don Giuseppe Palmisano
Diletta D'Emilio as Lavinia Lanfranchi
Enzo De Caro as Vincenzo Di Santo
Nicola Di Gioia as Vullo
Stefano Dionisi as Sante Palmisano
Massimo Ghini as Paolo Cento
Giorgio Gobbi as Carlo Brandi
Fiorenza Tessari as Paola Lanfranchi
Anna Valle as Maria Palmisano
Pamela Villoresi as Ada Di Santo

See also
List of Italian television series

References

External links
 
 
 Location cinematografiche in Calabria
 Era Mio Fratello, La ‘Ndrangheta in TV at DC Mag

Italian television miniseries
2007 television specials
RAI original programming
Films set in Calabria
2007 Italian television series debuts
Television series about organized crime
Works about the 'Ndrangheta
Films directed by Claudio Bonivento